This is a list of destinations served by now-defunct Mexican airline Aeromar as of January 2023:

References

Lists of airline destinations
Regional airlines of Mexico